"Last Drop" is the second single from Kevin Lyttle's self-titled debut album. It was released as a follow-up to Lyttle's highly popular international debut single "Turn Me On", and was only met with modest chart success.

Track listings
 CD single
 "Last Drop" (featuring Spragga Benz) – 3:28
 "Drive Me Crazy" (featuring Mr. Easy) (Non Album Track) – 3:32

 CD maxi
 "Last Drop" (featuring Spragga Benz) – 3:28
 "I Like" (Non Album Track) – 3:48
 "Drive Me Crazy" (featuring Mr. Easy) (Non Album Track) – 3:32
 "Last Drop" (Video Enhancement)

Charts

References

External links
 Official Kevin Lyttle website

2004 singles
Kevin Lyttle songs
2004 songs
Atlantic Records singles